Pope Anastasius I was the bishop of Rome from 27 November 399 to his death on 19 December 401.

Anastasius was born in Rome, and was the son of Maximus. He succeeded Siricius as Pope and condemned the writings of the Alexandrian theologian Origen shortly after their translation into Latin. He fought against these writings throughout his papacy, and in 400 he called a council to discuss them. The council agreed that Origen was not faithful to the Church.

During his reign, he also encouraged Christians in North Africa to fight Donatism. He instructed priests to stand and bow their head as they read from the gospels. Among his friends were Augustine, Jerome, and Paulinus. Jerome speaks of him as a man of great holiness who was rich in his poverty. He died in Rome and was eventually buried in the Catacomb of Pontian together with immediate successor, Innocent I. Jerome also referred to Anastasius as Innocent's father, although scholars have argued this was displaying a hierarchical relationship rather than a biological one.

References

External links

Opera Omnia by Migne Patrologia Latina
 
 

 

401 deaths
4th-century Romans
5th-century Christian saints
5th-century Romans
Papal saints
Popes
Year of birth unknown
4th-century popes
5th-century popes